Des murs et des hommes (English: Walls and People) is a 2013 documentary film directed by Dalila Ennadre.

Synopsis 
A voice embodying Casablanca's old medina recounts the stories of the inhabitants who live inside its walls.

Festivals, awards and accolades 

 2014 : Panorama des Cinémas du Maghreb et du Moyen-Orient (PCMMO) 
 2014 : Dubai International Film Festival (DIFF) 
 2014: 6th International Festival of Documentary Film (FIDADOC) (awarded Grand TV 2M Prize)

References 

2013 documentary films
2013 films